

Major League Baseball
World Series: New York Yankees over San Francisco Giants (4–3); Ralph Terry, MVP
All-Star Game (#1), July 10 at D.C. Stadium: National League, 3–1; Maury Wills, MVP
All-Star Game (#2), July 30 at Wrigley Field: American League, 9–4; Leon Wagner, MVP

Other champions
College World Series: Michigan
Cuban National Series: Industriales
Japan Series: Toei Flyers over Hanshin Tigers (4–2–1)
Little League World Series: Moreland, San Jose, California
Senior League World Series: West Hempstead, New York

Awards and honors
Baseball Hall of Fame
Bob Feller
Bill McKechnie
Jackie Robinson
Edd Roush
Most Valuable Player
Mickey Mantle, New York Yankees, OF (AL)
Maury Wills, Los Angeles Dodgers, SS (NL)
Cy Young Award
Don Drysdale, Los Angeles Dodgers
Rookie of the Year
Tom Tresh, New York Yankees, SS (AL)
Ken Hubbs, Chicago Cubs, 2B (NL)

Statistical leaders

MLB statistical leaders

Major league baseball final standings

American League final standings

National League final standings

Events

January–April
January 23 – In their first year of eligibility, Bob Feller and Jackie Robinson are selected for the Hall of Fame by the Baseball Writers' Association of America.
January 28 – Edd Roush and Bill McKechnie are added to the Hall of Fame by the Special Veterans Committee.
April 10 – In the first regular-season game ever at Dodger Stadium, the Cincinnati Reds spoil the Los Angeles Dodgers' opening-day party by beating them 6–3. That same day, in the very first Major League Baseball game played in the state of Texas, the Houston Colt .45s play their first game in franchise history, defeating the Chicago Cubs 11-2.
April 11 – The New York Mets play the first official game in franchise history, an 11–4 loss to the St. Louis Cardinals at Busch Stadium in St. Louis, Missouri. Gil Hodges and Charlie Neal provide bright spots for the Mets, hitting the first two home runs in the new franchise's history.
April 12 – In his Major League debut, Pete Richert of the Los Angeles Dodgers ties Karl Spooner's record by striking out the first six Major League batters he faces. He enters the game against the Cincinnati Reds at Dodger Stadium with two out in the second inning and strikes out Vada Pinson for the final out. He then records a four-strikeout third inning; the victims are Frank Robinson, Gordy Coleman (who reaches first on a Johnny Roseboro passed ball), Wally Post and Johnny Edwards. To date, Richert is the only pitcher to strike out four batters in one inning in his Major League debut. His record-tying sixth strikeout is of Tommy Harper leading off the fourth inning. The Dodgers defeat the Reds 11–7 with Richert gaining the victory, having struck out seven batters, walking none, and allowing no hits in 3 innings.
April 13 – National League baseball officially returns to New York City, as the New York Mets play the first home game in franchise history, a 4–3 loss to the Pittsburgh Pirates at the Polo Grounds.
April 18 – Ernie Banks hits his 300th career home run, helping the Chicago Cubs beat the Houston Colt .45s 3–2.
April 23 – The New York Mets earn their first victory in franchise history, 9–1 over the Pittsburgh Pirates in Pittsburgh.

May–August
May 5 – Bo Belinsky of the Los Angeles Angels no-hits the Baltimore Orioles 2–0 at Dodger Stadium. The no-hitter is the first in both franchise and stadium history.
May 12 – New York Mets relief pitcher Craig Anderson wins both ends of a doubleheader against the Milwaukee Braves. Success will soon turn to failure, because Anderson will lose his next 16 decisions on the season and 19 decisions overall. In fact, he will never win another game in the major leagues.
May 29 – Ernie Banks hits three home runs, but his Chicago Cubs still fall to the Milwaukee Braves 11–9 at Wrigley Field in Chicago.
June 10 – Los Angeles Angels catcher Earl Averill, Jr. tied a Major League record by reaching base in 17 consecutive at-bats, a streak he started on June 3, tying the mark set by Piggy Ward in the 1893 season.
June 18:
At the Polo Grounds, Hank Aaron of the Milwaukee Braves hits a home run over the center field wall. The shot, a grand slam, comes off Jay Hook in the Braves' 7-1 victory over the New York Mets and is the second in back-to-back days, and the third overall, to clear that wall. The day before, Lou Brock of the Chicago Cubs had hit one over the center field wall, off the Mets' Al Jackson in the first game of a doubleheader. Joe Adcock had been the only other player to hit a home run over the Polo Grounds' center field wall, doing so for the Braves against the New York Giants on April 29, . 
At Dodger Stadium, Stan Musial of the St. Louis Cardinals legs out a single off of Sandy Koufax in the second inning, giving him his 5,855th career total base, which breaks Ty Cobb's 37-year-old all-time record. The Cardinals would lose to the Dodgers 1–0.
June 26 – At Fenway Park, Boston Red Sox pitcher Earl Wilson no-hits the Los Angeles Angels 2–0 and helps his own cause by homering in the same game. Rick Wise will join them in 1971, homering twice in his no-hitter.
June 27 – In Pittsburgh, the Mets' Richie Ashburn singles in the fourth inning against Bob Friend. It is Ashburn's 2,500th career hit, and he is the 39th player in history to reach that level. the Pirates win the game, 6-5, in 10 innings.

June 30 – At Dodger Stadium, Sandy Koufax of the Los Angeles Dodgers no-hits the New York Mets 5–0. He begins the game by striking out the first three batters (Richie Ashburn, Rod Kanehl and Félix Mantilla) on nine pitches. The no-hitter is the first by a Dodger since the franchise's move from Brooklyn after the 1957 season, as well as the only one to feature an immaculate inning to date. Koufax will go on to pitch no-hitters in each of the next three seasons, including his perfect game in 1965; his record of four career no-hitters will be broken by Nolan Ryan in 1981.
July 9 – At a meeting held in conjunction with the All-Star Game, the major league players request a reduced schedule for the 1963 season. They also vote unanimously to continue playing two All-Star Games each year.
July 10 – At newly opened D.C. Stadium, John F. Kennedy becomes the only U.S. president ever to throw the ceremonial first pitch at an All-Star Game, as the National League beats the American League, 3–1, in the first All-Star Game of 1962. Highlights include Maury Wills scoring two of the NL's three runs, Roberto Clemente rapping three hits, and Willie Mays making an amazing game-ending catch. Wills receives the first All-Star MVP honors.
July 11 – For the first time since 1938, when Lloyd and Paul Waner pulled the trick, brothers Hank and Tommie Aaron hit home runs in the same inning. Both were hit in the last of the ninth, and Hank's grand slam provides the winning margin in an 8–6 Braves win over the Cardinals.
July 14 – Unfortunately for Ralph Branca, it is 11 years too late and it doesn't count anyway.  In the New York Mets' first Old-Timers' Game, reliever Ralph Branca faces Bobby Thomson, the man who hit the historic 1951 home run against him to give the Giants the 1951 pennant. This time Branca gets Thomson out on a fly ball to center field. In the real game itself, the Dodgers smash the Mets, 17-0.
July 18 – The Minnesota Twins become the first  major league club in the 20th century to hit two grand slams in one inning when Bob Allison and Harmon Killebrew connect in a team-record 11-run first inning against the Cleveland Indians. Pitchers Barry Latman and Jim Perry serve the grand gophers in the Twins' 14–3 drubbing of the Tribe.
July 20 – The Cardinals' Minnie Miñoso returns to action for the first time since May 11, when he fractured his skull and broke his right wrist running into an outfield wall. On August 19, he is hit by a pitch by the Mets' Craig Anderson in the 6th and suffers a broken bone in his left forearm.
July 22 – The Chicago White Sox Floyd Robinson is 6 for 6 – all singles – in a 7-3 victory over the Boston Red Sox.
July 26 – Warren Spahn of the Milwaukee Braves sets the National League record for home runs by a pitcher, when he hits his 31st off New York's Craig Anderson. Spahn also deals the Mets their 11th straight loss in a 6–1 Milwaukee victory.
July 30 – Home runs by Leon Wagner, Pete Runnels, and Rocky Colavito power the American League past the National League 9–4 in the second All-Star Game of 1962. Wagner is selected MVP.
August 1 – Bill Monbouquette of the Boston Red Sox no-hits the Chicago White Sox 1–0 at Comiskey Park, the Red Sox' second no-hitter of the season. Al Smith, who walked in the second inning, is the only baserunner Monbouquette allows. Monbouquette's catcher, Jim Pagliaroni, scores the game's lone run, on a Lou Clinton single in the eighth inning.
August 26 – At Metropolitan Stadium, Jack Kralick of the Minnesota Twins no-hits the Kansas City Athletics, 1–0. The no-hitter is the first in the franchise's Minnesota history; they had moved from Washington, D.C. after the 1960 season. Kralick retires the first 25 batters before a walk to the 26th hitter spoils his bid for a perfect game.

September–December
September 9 - Tony Oliva makes his major league debut, striking out in his only plate appearance in Minnesota's 10-9 loss to the Detroit Tigers.
September 10 – Mickey Mantle hits his 400th career home run, helping the New York Yankees beat the Detroit Tigers 3–1.
September 16 – Willie Stargell makes his major league debut as a pinch hitter going 0-1 in the Pirates 6-4 win over the Giants.
October 3 – Eleven years to the day since the New York Giants beat the Brooklyn Dodgers for the National League pennant on Bobby Thomson's Shot Heard Round the World home run, the San Francisco Giants score four runs in the ninth to defeat the Los Angeles Dodgers at Dodger Stadium, 6–4, in the third game of a playoff to determine the 1962 NL pennant.
October 16 – The New York Yankees defeat the San Francisco Giants, 1–0, in the seventh game of the World Series to win their second straight World Championship and 20th overall. The Giants, down to their last out, threaten with Matty Alou on third and Willie Mays on second, but Yankees second baseman Bobby Richardson snags a screaming line drive by Willie McCovey to preserve the win. New York pitcher Ralph Terry is named Series MVP.
November 23 – Los Angeles Dodgers shortstop Maury Wills, whose 104 stolen bases broke a major league season-record set by Ty Cobb, wins the National League Most Valuable Player Award. In a controversial vote, Wills beats out teammate Tommy Davis, who led the league with a .346 batting average and 153 RBI.
November 29:
After 61 years, the American Association (AAA) folds, with some of the franchises being absorbed by the International League and the Pacific Coast League. The PCL adds the Dallas-Fort Worth, Texas; Denver, Colorado and Oklahoma City, Oklahoma clubs and drops the Vancouver, BC club. The International League adds the Indianapolis, Indiana and Little Rock, Arkansas clubs. As a result, both leagues became ten-club leagues.
The players' pension fund will receive 95 percent of the one game's proceeds (rather than 60 percent of the two games).
December 1 – A complete classification overhaul in Minor League Baseball is made. The Eastern and South Atlantic leagues are promoted from Class A to Class AA. Meanwhile, Classes B, C and D are abolished, with those leagues being promoted to Class A. The Class B leagues were the Carolina and Northwest leagues; the Class-C leagues were the California, Mexican Center, Northern, and Pioneer leagues. The Class D leagues were the Florida State, Georgia-Florida, Midwest, New York-Pennsylvania and Western Carolinas leagues. The Appalachian League moves from Class D to Rookie League classification.

Movies
Safe at Home!

Births

January
January 3 – Darren Daulton
January 4 – Jay Tibbs
January 5 – Danny Jackson
January 7 – Jeff Montgomery
January 10 – Mario Díaz
January 10 – Jim Lindeman
January 11 – Donn Pall
January 13 – Kevin Mitchell
January 14 – Gary Green
January 19 – Chris Sabo
January 23 – Benny Distefano
January 25 – Juan Castillo
January 26 – Rick Schu

February
February 2 – Pat Clements
February 2 – Paul Kilgus
February 3 – Joe Klink
February 4 – Dan Plesac
February 14 – Bruce Crabbe
February 15 – Rolando Roomes
February 16 – Dwayne Henry
February 18 – Rocky Childress
February 19 – Álvaro Espinoza
February 26 – Kelly Gruber
February 27 – Greg Cadaret

March
March 1 – Mark Gardner
March 2 – Terry Steinbach
March 7 – José Canó
March 7 – Germán González
March 12 – Darryl Strawberry
March 13 – Tom Funk
March 13 – Terry Lee
March 18 – Brian Fisher
March 19 – Iván Calderón
March 20 – Kuo Tai-yuan
March 24 – Ron Robinson
March 25 – Jeff Kunkel
March 26 – Kevin Seitzer
March 29 – Billy Beane

April
April 1 – Rich Amaral
April 3 – Marty Clary
April 3 – Dave Miley
April 11 – Tim Fortugno
April 13 – Jeff Bittiger
April 21 – Les Lancaster
April 28 – Russ Morman
April 28 – Luis Quiñones

May
May 2 – Jim Walewander
May 5 – Ramón Peña
May 6 – Tom Bolton
May 8 – Orestes Destrade
May 9 – Laddie Renfroe
May 10 – Joey Meyer
May 10 – Robby Thompson
May 17 – Greg Mathews
May 29 – Eric Davis
May 31 – Joe Orsulak

June
June 1 – Jessie Reid
June 2 – Darnell Coles
June 8 – John Gibbons
June 12 – Darrel Akerfelds
June 16 – Wally Joyner
June 16 – Calvin Schiraldi
June 17 – Stu Tate
June 18 – Dave Leiper
June 19 – Craig Smajstrla
June 22 – Bryan Price
June 23 – Chris Beasley
June 24 – Charlie Mitchell
June 30 – Tony Fernández

July
July 4 – Johnny Abrego
July 5 – Jeff Innis
July 11 – Brian Brady
July 13 – Robbie Wine
July 19 – Dick Scott
July 25 – Doug Drabek
July 26 – Jody Reed
July 29 – Randy McCament
July 30 – Tom Pagnozzi
July 31 – Ed Hickox

August
August 1 – Scott Anderson
August 3 – Mackey Sasser
August 4 – Roger Clemens
August 4 – John Farrell
August 7 – John Trautwein
August 10 – Mike Schooler
August 12 – Urbano Lugo
August 12 – Dave Pavlas
August 14 – Mark Gubicza
August 18 – Scott Arnold
August 23 – C. B. Bucknor
August 25 – Oddibe McDowell
August 31 – Greg Tubbs

September
September 2 – Johnny Paredes
September 3 – Dave Clark
September 8 – Al Pardo
September 9 – Joe Strong
September 19 – Randy Myers
September 22 – Ray Stephens
September 24 – Doug Davis
September 27 – Don Schulze
September 28 – Todd Frohwirth
September 28 – Rob Woodward
September 30 – Dave Magadan

October
October 3 – Rich Surhoff
October 4 – Dennis Cook
October 4 – Tony Ferreira
October 4 – Chris James
October 5 – Tracy Woodson
October 6 – Rich Yett
October 12 – Sid Fernandez
October 14 – Carl Nichols
October 17 – Glenn Braggs
October 19 – Oswaldo Peraza
October 20 – Randy Asadoor
October 24 – Gene Larkin
October 27 – Terry Bell
October 27 – Mike Dunne
October 30 – Mark Portugal
October 30 – Danny Tartabull

November
November 3 – Sherman Corbett
November 6 – Leo García
November 8 – John Fishel
November 8 – Rey Palacios
November 9 – Dion James
November 11 – Cory Snyder
November 12 – Jeff Reed
November 12 – Wilfredo Tejada
November 14 – Steve Peters
November 16 – Mike Raczka
November 17 – Ray Chadwick
November 18 – Jamie Moyer
November 21 – Dick Schofield
November 24 – Randy Velarde
November 26 – Chuck Finley
November 30 – Bo Jackson
November 30 – Gary Wayne

December
December 1 – Tim Jones
December 4 – Stan Jefferson
December 5 – Alan Cockrell
December 5 – Germán Jiménez
December 19 – Clay Parker
December 19 – Bill Wegman
December 22 – John Hoover
December 25 – Marty Pevey
December 25 – Bruce Walton
December 29 – Devon White

Deaths

January
January 5 – Dick Lundy, 63, All-Star shortstop, second baseman and manager in the Negro leagues between 1916 and 1940; unofficially batted .484 in 1921, led Eastern Colored League in RBI (with 76) in 1927, and captured batting title of East–West League (.381) in 1932.
January 5 – Frank Snyder, 68, catcher who appeared in 1,392 games for the St. Louis Cardinals and New York Giants from 1912 to 1927, including Giants' 1921–22 World Series champions.
January 6 – Billy Purtell, 76, infielder—chiefly a third baseman—who played in 335 career contests for the Chicago White Sox (1908–1910), Boston Red Sox (1910–1911) and Detroit Tigers (1914).
January 7 – Ad Brennan, 74, left-hander who pitched for four clubs, chiefly Philadelphia of the National League and Chicago of the "outlaw" Federal League, from 1910–1915 and in 1918.
January 7 – Dutch Lerchen, 72, shortstop for the 1910 Boston Red Sox.
January 10 – Fred Bratschi, 69, backup outfielder for the Chicago White Sox and Boston Red Sox between 1921 and 1927.
January 10 – Tillie Shafer, 72, infielder and pinch hitter who played in 283 games for the New York Giants (1909–1910, 1912–1913); appeared in both 1912 and 1913 World Series on losing teams.
January 14 – Les Mann, 68, outfielder for five NL teams who in the 1914 World Series drove in Game 2's only run in the top of the 9th and scored the winning run in the 12th inning of Game 3 for the "Miracle Braves".
January 14 – Pep Young, 54, second baseman who played in 730 games over ten seasons for three National League clubs, chiefly the Pittsburgh Pirates, between 1933 and 1945.
January 18 – Bob Barrett, 82, third baseman who played 239 MLB games for the Chicago Cubs (1923–1925), Brooklyn Robins (1925 and 1927) and Boston Red Sox (1929).
January 22 – Lefty Russell, 71, pitcher who dropped five of six career decisions over 13 games as a member of the 1910–1912 Philadelphia Athletics.
January 26 – Steve O'Neill, 70, longtime catcher for Cleveland Indians and member of 1920 World Series champions who later managed the Detroit Tigers to the 1945 title; also skippered the Indians, Boston Red Sox and Philadelphia Phillies between 1935 and 1954; one of four brothers to play in majors.
January 27 – Joe Vosmik, 51, All-Star outfielder (1935) for five MLB teams (1930–1941 and 1944), principally his hometown Indians, who hit .307 lifetime and exceeded the .300 mark six times; led American League in hits (216), doubles (47) and triples (20) in 1935; also led AL in hits (201) in 1938.
January 27 – Jim Shaw, 68, reliable starter and reliever on Washington Senators' pitching staff from 1913 to 1921; won 15 or more games four times; led 1919 American League in games pitched, innings pitched, and saves; also led Junior Circuit in saves in 1914.
January 27 – Bob Steele, 67, Canadian southpaw who posted a 16–38 won–lost mark and a 3.05 earned run average in 91 career appearances for the St. Louis Cardinals, Pittsburgh Pirates and New York Giants from 1916 to 1919.
January 28 – Steve Melter, 76, pitcher who appeared in 23 games, 22 in relief, for the 1909 St. Louis Cardinals.

February
February 6 – Ernest Lanigan, 89, statistician, sportswriter and historian who in the 1890s devised the run batted in and other statistics, in 1922 wrote the sport's first comprehensive biographical encyclopedia; later historian at the Hall of Fame for ten years.
February 9 – Tex Burnett, 62, catcher/first baseman/outfielder who appeared for nine different Negro leagues clubs over 12 seasons between 1922 and 1941.
February 10 – Roy Walker, 68, pitcher who worked in 91 career games for the Cleveland Naps (1912) and Indians (1915), Chicago Cubs (1917–1918) and St. Louis Cardinals (1921–1922).
February 22 – Paul Speraw, 68, whose 16-year professional career included one game in MLB as a third baseman for the St. Louis Browns on September 15, 1920.
February 24 – Max Bishop, 62, second baseman for the Philadelphia Athletics from 1924 to 1933, member of Philadelphia's AL pennant winners from 1929–1931 and 1929–1930 World Series champions; coach at the Naval Academy since 1938.
February 25 – Tink Turner, 72, pitcher who appeared in one game (hurling two innings) for last-place 1915 Philadelphia Athletics; spent 1924 season as a St. Louis Cardinals coach.

March
March 1 – Hal Janvrin, 69, infielder who appeared in 759 games over ten seasons for four clubs between 1911 and 1922, notably the Boston Red Sox, where he was a member of the 1915 and 1916 world championship squads.
March 1 – Horace Jenkins, 70, outfielder who played between 1910 and 1921 for a series of Chicago-based Negro leagues teams.
March 4 – George Mogridge, 73, left-handed hurler who won 132 games over a 15-year MLB career between 1911 and 1927 with five teams, notably the 1915–1920 New York Yankees and 1921–1925 Washington Senators; key contributor to Senators' 1924 world champions.
March 12 – Fred Beck, 75, first baseman/outfielder for Boston, Cincinnati and Philadelphia of the National League (1909–1911) and Chicago of the "outlaw" Federal League (1914–1915), whose ten home runs tied him for the NL long-ball championship in 1910.
March 16 – Sumpter Clarke, 64, outfielder who played 37 total games for 1920 Chicago Cubs and 1923–1924 Cleveland Indians.
March 16 – Harry Feldman, 42, pitcher who worked in 143 games for the 1941–1946 New York Giants.
March 16 – George Orme, 70, backup outfielder who played for the 1920 Boston Red Sox.
March 17 – Kay Rohrer, 39, All-American Girls Professional Baseball League catcher for the 1945 Rockford Peaches champion team.
March 20 – John Black, 72, first baseman who batted but .151 in 54 games and 186 at-bats for the 1911 St. Louis Browns.
March 22 – Lee DeMontreville, 87, shortstop/second baseman for 1903 St. Louis Cardinals.
March 22 – "Oyster Joe" Martina, 72, pitcher who went 349–277 in 833 career games in the minor leagues, but played only 24 games and one season (1924) in the majors as a member of the World Series champion Washington Senators.
March 29 – Otto Miller, 72, catcher for the Brooklyn Dodgers, Superbas and Robins from 1910 to 1922, including two NL champions (1916, 1920).
March 30 – Charlie French, 78, second baseman/shortstop/outfielder who played 105 games for the Boston Red Sox and Chicago White Sox in 1909 and 1910.

April
April 4 – Snooks Dowd, 64, infielder who appeared in 16 MLB games, chiefly as a pinch runner, for the Detroit Tigers and Philadelphia Athletics in 1919 and the Brooklyn Robins in 2016.
April 5 – Vince Shupe, 40, first baseman for the 1945 Boston Braves, and one of many players who only appeared in the majors during World War II.
April 10 – Milt Watson, 72, right-hander who pitched in 90 games from 1916 to 1919 for the St. Louis Cardinals and Philadelphia Phillies.
April 13 – Bill Akers, 57, infielder for 1929–1931 Detroit Tigers and 1932 Boston Braves who got into 174 career games.
April 21 – Bill Norman, 51, outfielder for the Chicago White Sox in 1931–1932, longtime minor league pilot, and manager of the Tigers from June 11, 1958 through May 2, 1959.
April 30 – Al Demaree, 77, pitcher who won 80 games for four NL teams, later a noted sports cartoonist.
April 30 – Russ Miller, 62, pitcher with the Philadelphia Phillies in 1927 and 1928; went 0–12 (5.42 ERA) in the latter season, and 1–13 (.071 winning percentage) lifetime.

May
May 8 – Buster Burrell, 95, 19th-century catcher who played in 122 total games for the 1891 New York Giants and 1895–1897 Brooklyn Bridegrooms.
May 10 – Lefty Willis, 56, pitcher for the Philadelphia Athletics from 1925 to 1927.
May 23 – Rip Radcliff, 56, All-Star outfielder who batted .311 during his ten-season, 1,081-game career for the Chicago White Sox, St. Louis Browns and Detroit Tigers; led AL in hits in 1940.
May 24 – Barney Morris, 51, two-time All-Star pitcher in the Negro leagues between 1932 and 1948; member of 1947 Negro World Series champion New York Cubans.
May 24 – Rabbit Nill, 80, infielder who appeared in 296 games between 1904 and 1908 for the Washington Senators and Cleveland Naps.
May 28 – George Anderson, 72, outfielder for 1914–1915 Brooklyn Tip-Tops (Federal League) and 1918 St. Louis Cardinals, appearing in 269 total games.

June
June 1 – Jim Faulkner, 62, left-hander who compiled a 10–8 won–lost mark (3.75 ERA) in 43 career games for the 1927–1928 New York Giants and 1930 Brooklyn Robins.
June 2 – Art Stokes, 65, pitcher who appeared in a dozen games for 1925 Philadelphia Athletics.
June 7 – George Shively, 69, Negro league baseball left fielder from 1910 to 1924.
June 11 – Bert Abbey, 92, 19th-century pitcher who hurled for Washington, Chicago and Brooklyn of the National League between 1892 and 1896.
June 11 – Nap Kloza, 58, Polish-born outfielder for the St. Louis Browns in the early 1930s, later a manager for the AAGPBL Rockford Peaches.
June 13 – Red Lanning, 67, outfielder and southpaw pitcher who appeared in 19 total games (six on the mound) for the horrendous 1916 Philadelphia Athletics, losers of 117 of 153 games.
June 24 – Steve Basil, 69, American League umpire from 1936–1942 who worked 1,037 regular season games, the 1937 and 1940 World Series, and the 1938 and 1940 All-Star games.
June 27 – Charlie Schmutz, 71, pitcher who made 19 appearances for the 1914–1915 Brooklyn Robins.
June 28 – Mickey Cochrane, 59, Hall of Fame catcher for Philadelphia Athletics (1925–1933) and Detroit Tigers (1934–1937); American League MVP in 1928 and 1934, and batted .320 lifetime; member of 1929–1930 World Series champions who also managed Tigers to World Series title in 1935.
June 28 – Cy Morgan, 83, pitcher who spent a decade in the majors between 1903 and 1913 with four clubs, notably the 1909–1912 Athletics, where he was a member of their 1910–1911 World Series champions.

July
July 1 – Sam Mayer, 69, who appeared in 11 games, primarily as an outfielder, for the 1915 Washington Senators.
July 2 – Josh Clarke, 83, outfielder in 233 games over five major-league seasons between 1898 and 1911 for Louisville, St. Louis and Boston of the National League, and Cleveland of the American League.
July 3 – Jimmy Walsh, 76, native of Ireland and outfielder for the 1916 Boston Red Sox world champions, who also hit better than .300 ten times in the International League, winning the league batting title in 1925 and 1926.
July 9 – Moose McCormick, 81, outfielder who played in 429 games over five National League seasons for New York, Pittsburgh and Philadelphia between 1904 and 1913.
July 12 – Mary Moore, 40, All-American Girls Professional Baseball League pitcher and member of the 1948 Rockford Peaches champion team.
July 14 – Howard Craghead, 54, pitched for the Cleveland Indians in the 1931 and 1933 seasons.
July 17 – Sport McAllister, 87, versatile, turn-of-the-century outfielder/infielder who appeared in 418 games, 415 of them with the Cleveland Spiders and Detroit Tigers, between 1896 and 1903.
July 18 – Carl Holling, 66, pitched for the Detroit Tigers in the 1920s.
July 20 – Donald Lee Barnes, 68, principal owner of the St. Louis Browns from 1936 to 1945; his 1944 Browns won that franchise's only American League pennant.
July 23 – Ralph Shinners, 66, outfielder for the New York Giants and St. Louis Cardinals from 1922 to 1925, and later a manager in the AAGPBL.
July 29 – Burt Shotton, 77, speedy outfielder who appeared in 1,387 games for the St. Louis Browns, Washington Senators and St. Louis Cardinals between 1909 and 1923; managed Brooklyn Dodgers to National League pennants in 1947 and 1949; also piloted Philadelphia Phillies from 1928 to 1933.

August
August 3 – War Sanders, 85, left-handed hurler who went 2–8 (5.64 ERA) over 12 games pitched for the 1903–1904 St. Louis Cardinals.
August 5 – Marilyn Monroe, 36, actress and former wife of Hall of Famer Joe DiMaggio.
August 6 – Bob Williams, 78, backup catcher for the 1911–1913 New York Highlanders/Yankees who appeared in 46 career games.
August 7 – Bill Pierce, 72, first baseman and catcher in Black baseball and the Negro leagues during the period of 1910 to 1924; player-manager of 1922 Baltimore Black Sox.
August 11 – Jake Volz, 84, pitcher for the Boston Americans, Boston Beaneaters and Cincinnati Reds between 1901 and 1908.
August 19 – Myron H. Wilson, 74, principal owner of the Cleveland Indians from 1952 to 1956 and club president from 1952 until his death.

September
September 1 – Hank Garrity, 54, catcher for the 1931 Chicago White Sox.
September 4 – Pete Washington, 59, centerfielder who played in the Negro leagues between 1923 and 1936.
September 5 – John Potts, 75, appeared in 41 games as an outfielder and pinch hitter for Kansas City of the Federal League in 1914.
September 12 – Spot Poles, 74, star outfielder of the Negro leagues.
September 18 – Joe Green, 84, player-manager of the 1920–1921 Chicago Giants of the Negro National League.
September 23 – Ted Stockard, 59, infielder for Cleveland (1927–1928) and Indianapolis (1931) of the Negro National League.
September 24 – Joe Cambria, 72, Italian-born minor league player and club owner who became a pioneering scout covering Cuba for the Washington Senators and Minnesota Twins franchise from the 1930s until his death; signed stars Tony Oliva, Camilo Pascual and Zoilo Versalles, and many other MLB standouts.
September 27 – Stan Sperry, 48, second baseman who played in 80 career games for the 1936 and 1938 Philadelphia Athletics.
September 30 – Cap Crowell, 70, pitcher who went 2–11 (5.27 ERA) in 19 total games for terrible Athletics teams of 1915 and 1916.

October
October 2 – Earl Yingling, 73, who appeared in 140 big-league games as a left-handed pitcher, outfielder and pinch hitter for four clubs, chiefly Brooklyn and Cincinnati, over five seasons spanning 1911 to 1918.
October 3 – Don Songer, 63, left-hander who pitched in 71 career games for the Pittsburgh Pirates and New York Giants from 1924 to 1927.
October 5 – Jack Cummings, 58, good-hitting, seldom-used catcher/pinch hitter who batted .341 lifetime in 89 games and 151 plate appearances for 1926–1929 New York Giants and 1929 Boston Braves.
October 6 – Dick Gossett, 72, catcher in 49 contests for the New York Yankees over all or parts of the 1913–1914 seasons.
October 8 – Ralph Head, 69, right-hander who went 2–9 (6.66 ERA) in 35 games for 1923 Philadelphia Phillies.
October 11 – Dusty Decker, 50, shortstop/second baseman who played in the Negro leagues (1932, 1937) and was a star college football quarterback—nicknamed "The Human Catapult"—at historically black Fisk University.
October 12 – Rube Geyer, 78, pitcher for the 1910–1913 St. Louis Cardinals.
October 15 – Possum Whitted, 72, utility man for 1914 "Miracle Boston Braves" World Series champions; appeared in 1,025 career games, primarily as an outfielder and third baseman, for the Braves, St. Louis Cardinals, Philadelphia Phillies, Pittsburgh Pirates and Brooklyn Robins between 1912 and 1922.
October 16 – Ray Powell, 73, outfielder for 1913 Detroit Tigers and 1917–1924 Boston Braves; led National League in triples (18) in 1921.
October 17 – Olaf Henriksen, 74, Boston Red Sox reserve outfielder (1911–1917) who was a member of three World Series champions (1912, 1915, 1916); as of 2022, the only MLB player to have been born in Denmark.
October 20 – Tim Murchison, 66, southpaw pitcher who appeared in three total games for 1917 St. Louis Cardinals and 1920 Cleveland Indians, allowing only three hits and one unearned run in six innings of work; longtime scout.
October 31 – Larry Goetz, 67, National League umpire from 1936 to 1956, worked in three World Series and two All-Star Games.

November
November 12 – Harvey Smith, 91, third baseman who appeared in 36 games for the 1896 Washington Senators of the National League.
November 14 – Dick Hoblitzel, 74, first baseman on Red Sox champions of 1915–1916.
November 16 – Hugh High, 75, outfielder for the Detroit Tigers and New York Yankees between 1913–1918; brother of Andy and Charlie High.
November 21 – Whitey Hilcher, 53, pitcher who appeared in 31 games for the Cincinnati Reds over four seasons spanning 1931 to 1936.
November 27 – Bob Peterson, 78, catcher for the Boston Americans between 1906 and 1907.
November 28 – Harry Moran, 73, left-hander who appeared in 68 games for Buffalo (1914) and Newark (1915) of the "outlaw" Federal League; earlier, hurled in five contests for the 1912 Detroit Tigers.
November 29 – Red Kress, 55, coach for the 1962 New York Mets; also coached for Detroit Tigers, New York Giants, Cleveland Indians and Los Angeles Angels for 14 seasons between 1940 and 1961; previously an AL shortstop during the 1930s.

December
December 4 – Ben Cantwell, 60, pitcher for New York Giants, Boston Braves and Bees, and Brooklyn Dodgers who appeared in 316 games between 1927 and 1937; won 20 games, losing ten, for 1933 Braves squad, then, two years later posted a 4–25 won–lost record pitching for a horrendous Boston club that lost 115 of its 153 games played.
December 6 – Dutch Hoffman, 58, Chicago White Sox' centerfielder during the 1929 season, appearing in 107 games.
December 7 – Bobo Newsom, 55, colorful, much-traveled All-Star pitcher who won 211 games with nine different teams between 1929 and 1953, including five stints with the Washington Senators; starred in a losing cause for the Detroit Tigers in the 1940 World Series; three-time 20-game winner (1938 through 1940) and three-time 20-game loser (1934, 1941, 1945).
December 7 – J. G. Taylor Spink, 74, publisher and editor of The Sporting News since 1914 and a tireless champion of the sport.
December 8 – Bill Gatewood, 81, Negro leagues pitcher who appeared for as many as 21 teams over a 24-year span (1906–1929); led Negro National League in games won (15) in 1920.
December 14 – Bob Katz, 51, pitcher who made six appearances for the wartime-era 1944 Cincinnati Reds.
December 14 – Champ Osteen, 85, infielder who played in 83 career games for the 1903 Washington Senators, 1904 New York Highlanders and 1908–1909 St. Louis Cardinals.
December 14 – Dan Woodman, 69, pitcher who appeared in 18 contests for Buffalo of the Federal League in 1914–1915.
December 20 – Charlie Luskey, 86, outfielder/catcher in 11 games for the American League's maiden 1901 edition of the Washington Senators.
December 27 – Jake Flowers, 60, infielder between 1923 and 1934 for three National League teams; later an MLB coach.
December 29 – Tiny Graham, 70, -tall first baseman who played 25 games for 1914 Cincinnati Reds.
December 30 – Joe Boley, 66, shortstop for the Philadelphia Athletics (1927–1932) and Cleveland Indians (1932); key contributor to Philadelphia's 1929 and 1930 world championships and 1931 American League title.
December 31 – Al Mamaux, 68, pitcher who posted back-to-back 20-plus win seasons for the 1915–1916 Pittsburgh Pirates; also hurled for the Brooklyn Robins and New York Yankees during his 12 seasons in MLB.
December 31 – Del Mason, 79, right-hander who compiled a 5–16 (3.72) career record in 32 total games for the 1904 Washington Senators and 1906–1907 Cincinnati Reds.

References